Kellogg House can refer to:
In the United States
(listed by state, then city/town)
 Gen. Martin Kellogg House, Newington, Connecticut, listed on the National Register of Historic Places (NRHP) in Hartford County
 Enos Kellogg House, Norwalk, Connecticut, listed on the NRHP in Fairfield County
 Miles and Elizabeth Smith Kellogg House near Winterset, Iowa, listed on the NRHP in Madison County
 Godfrey-Kellogg House, Bangor, Maine, listed on the NRHP in Penobscot County
 Elijah Kellogg House, Harpswell, Maine, listed on the NRHP in Cumberland County
 Kellogg-Warden House, Ann Arbor, Michigan, listed on the NRHP in Washtenaw County
 W. K. Kellogg House, Battle Creek, Michigan, listed on the NRHP in Calhoun County
 Frank B. Kellogg House, St. Paul, Minnesota, listed on the NRHP in Ramsey County
 J. Francis Kellogg House, Avon, New York, listed on the NRHP in Livingston County
 The Kellogg House, Cornwall, New York, listed on the NRHP in Orange County
 Kellogg House (Cincinnati, Ohio), listed on the NRHP in Hamilton County
 John Kellogg House and Barn, Madison, Ohio, listed on the NRHP in Lake County
 White-Kellogg House, Oregon City, Oregon, listed on the NRHP in Clackamas County